This is a list of 88 genera in the family Cynipidae, gall wasps.

Cynipidae genera

 Acraspis Mayr, 1881 i c g b
 Amphibolips Reinhard, 1865 i c g b
 Andricus Hartig, 1840 i c g b
 Antistrophus Walsh, 1869 i g b
 Aphelonyx Mayr, 1881 i c g
 Atrusca Kinsey, 1930 i c g b
 Aulacidea Ashmead, 1897 i c g b
 Aulax Hartig, 1843 g
 Aylax Hartig, 1840 i c g
 Barbotinia Nieves-Aldrey, 1994 i c g
 Barucynips Medianero & Nieves-Aldrey, 2013 g
 Bassettia Ashmead, 1887 g
 Belonocnema Mayr, 1881 i c g b
 Biorhiza Westwood, 1840 i c g
 Buffingtonella Lobato-Vila & Pujade-Villar, 2019
 Burnettweldia Pujade-Villar, Melika & Nicholls, 2021b
 Callirhytis Förster, 1869 i c g b
 Cecconia Kieffer, 1902 i g
 Cecinothofagus Nieves-Aldrey & Liljeblad, 2009 g
 Ceroptres Hartig, 1840 i c g b
 Cerroneuroterus Melika & Pujade-Villar, 2010 g
 Chilaspis Mayr, 1881 i c g
 Coffeikokkos Pujade-Villar & Melika, 2012 g
 Cyclocynips Melika, Tang & Sinclair, 2013 g
 Cycloneuroterus Melika & Tang, 2011 g
 Cynips Linnaeus, 1758 i c g b
 Diastrophus Hartig, 1840 i c g b
 Diplolepis Geoffroy, 1762 i c g b
 Disholandricus Melika, Pujade-Villar & Nicholls, 2021b
 Disholcaspis Dalla Torre & Kieffer, 1910 i c g b
 Dros Kinsey, 1937
 Druon Kinsey, 1937
 Dryocosmus Giraud, 1859 i c g b
 Eschatocerus Mayr, 1881 i c g
 Euceroptres Ashmead, 1896 g
 Eumayria Ashmead, 1887 i c g
 Eumayriella Melika & Abrahamson, 1997 g
 Fontaliella Pujade-Villar, 2013 g
 Hedickiana Nieves-Aldrey, 1994 i c g
 Heteroecus Kinsey, 1922 i c g b
 Hodiernocynips Kovalev, 1994 g
 Hypodiranchis Ashmead, 1901 g
 Iraella Nieves-Aldrey, 1994 i c g
 Isocolus Förster, 1869 i c g
 Kinseyella Pujade-Villar & Melika, 2010 g
 Latuspina Monzen, 1954 g
 Leptolamina Yoshimoto, 1962 g
 Liebelia Kieffer, 1903 i c g
 Liposthenes Förster, 1869 i c g b
 Lithonecrus Nieves-Aldrey & Butterill, 2014 g
 Loxaulus Mayr, 1881 i c g
 Neaylax Nieves-Aldrey, 1994 i c g
 Nebulovena Pujade-Villar & Paretas-Martínez, 2012 g
 Neuroterus Hartig, 1840 i c g b (the jumping gall wasp)
 Nichollsiella Melika, Pujade-Villar & Stone 2021b
 Odontocynips Kieffer, 1910 i c g
 Palaeogronotoma Peñalver, Fontal-Cazalla & Pujade-Villar, 2013 g
 Panteliella Kieffer, 1901 i g
 Parapanteliella Diakonchuk, 1981 g
 Paraschiza Weld, 1944 g
 Paraulax Kieffer, 1904 i g
 Paribalia Weld, 1922 g
 Pediaspis Tischbein, 1852 i c g
 Periclistus Förster, 1869 i c g b
 Phanacis Förster, 1860 i c g
 Philonix Fitch, 1859 i c g b
 Phylloteras Ashmead, 1897 g b
 Plagiotrochus Mayr, 1881 i c g
 Pseudoneuroterus Kinsey, 1923 i c g
 Qwaqwaia Liljeblad, Nieves-Aldrey & Melika, 2011 g
 Rhodus Quinlan, 1968 i g
 Rhoophilus Mayr, 1881 i c g
 Saphonecrus Dalla Torre & Kieffer, 1910 g b
 Synergus Hartig, 1840 i c g b
 Synophromorpha Ashmead, 1903 i c g
 Synophrus Hartig, 1843 i c g
 Timaspis Mayr, 1881 i c g
 Trichagalma Mayr, 1907 i c g
 Trichoteras Ashmead, 1897 g
 Trigonaspis Hartig, 1840 i c g b
 Trisolenia Ashmead, 1887 g
 Ufo Melika & Pujade-Villar, 2005 g
 Vetustia Belizin, 1959 g
 Xanthoteras  b
 Xestophanes Förster, 1869 i c g
 Xystoteras Ashmead, 1897 g
 Zapatella Pujade-Villar & Melika, 2012 g b
 Zopheroteras Ashmead, 1897 g b

Data sources: i = ITIS, c = Catalogue of Life, g = GBIF, b = Bugguide.net

References

Lists of Hymenoptera